Ukrainians in Italy are mostly recent labor migrants. As of 31 December 2010, there were 380,000 Ukrainians in Italy. Many Ukrainian women make a living in Italy as caretakers for the elderly, terminally ill, children or entire families. Mistrustful of retirement homes, Italians have embraced Ukrainian migrants as an answer to a shortage of Italian in-home caregivers (making Ukrainians the fourth-largest immigrant community in Italy), a professional role snubbed by many native Italians, due to its physical difficulty and emotional stress.

Numbers and gender
According to a National Institute of Statistics (Istat) report about foreigners in Italy, there are 223,782 Ukrainians in Italy as of 2012, and about 80% of them are women. With many Ukrainian caregivers believed to be working or residing in Italy illegally, other estimates of their numbers range broadly, from 600,000 to 1 million. And while most Ukrainian immigrants eventually want to come back to Ukraine, some are choosing to stay permanently, becoming a part of the Italian society.

Religion 
In the years 2011 and 2012 the ISTAT made a survey regarding the religious affiliation among the immigrants in Italy, the religion of the Ukrainian people in Italy were as follows:
  Christianity: 90.8%, of which Orthodox Christians 68%, Catholics 22.5% and Protestants 0.3%
  Muslims: 0.1%
 Non religious: 5.6%
 Other religions: 3.5%

Ukrainian-Italian institutions
 Amateur theatre "Berehynia"

Notable people

See also 
 Italy–Ukraine relations
 Ucraini in Italia

References

Italy

Ethnic groups in Italy